Winning Lines is a National Lottery game show that was broadcast on BBC One from 12 June 1999 to 16 October 2004. It was originally hosted by Simon Mayo and then by Phillip Schofield.

Gameplay

Round 1
Forty-nine contestants take part in this round; each is assigned a two-digit number from 01 to 49. In the first series, Mayo asks a question that can be answered by one of these numbers, and anyone who believes that his/her number is the answer may buzz in. Contestants who buzz in wrongly are eliminated. If the owner of the correct number buzzes in; he/she advances to the next round; if not, he/she is eliminated. The host continues to ask questions until six contestants have qualified to advance, at which point all others are eliminated.

The format of this round was changed beginning with the second series. Each contestant now has a keypad on which to enter answers. Mayo or Schofield asks a question with a numerical answer, and the contestant who keys it in first in the fastest time advances to the next round. Anyone who enters an incorrect answer is eliminated from the game. As before, the round ends when six contestants have qualified to advance, and all others are eliminated.

The last digit from each of the six advancing players' numbers are displayed at the end of the show. Any home viewers who can form their own telephone number from these digits (in any order as always mentioned by Simon & Phillip) may call in for a chance to appear on the next episode.

Round 2 – Looking After Number One
The six qualifying contestants retain their numbers from the first round. The host asks a series of toss-up questions on the buzzer, each of which can be answered with the number of a contestant still in play at the time. If a contestant responds correctly with an opponent's number, that opponent is eliminated; a contestant who responds correctly with his/her own number remains in the game. An incorrect response eliminates the contestant who gave it, regardless of the number. If no one buzzes in on a question, the contestant with the correct number is eliminated. The last remaining contestant advances to the Wonderwall round for a chance to win a trip, whilst the last contestant eliminated from the game wins a holiday in the Countryside.

Bonus Round – The Wonderwall
The champion faces a set of three projection screens on which 49 answers are displayed, numbered 1 to 49, and has three minutes to answer as many questions as possible. The host gives the champion 15 seconds to study the answers, after which the questions begin and the clock starts to run. The champion must respond by giving both an answer and its number. The correct answer is then removed from the board, regardless of whether the contestant gave it or not. No penalties were given for incorrect answers.

Twice during the round, the champion may take a "pit stop" by pressing a handheld button. Doing so freezes the clock for 15 seconds, during which the champion may look over the answers again; however, he/she may not respond to the current question until the pit stop has ended.

The champion wins a trip whose destination depends on the number of correct answers given, as shown in the table below. During Schofield's tenure as host, the champion then played the Wonderwall again (on the same day as the Wednesday Lotto draw), but with no pit stops; each correct answer awarded £200 with a bonus of £1,000 for getting all 20, for a potential maximum of £5,000. Afterwards, they were then also given the right to start the midweek lottery draws. Due to the September 11 attacks, the three trips to continental American destinations were replaced with alternates for only the second half of the 2001 series.

The prize for giving only one correct answer was a stay at a bed-and-breakfast near the Gravelly Hill Interchange, popularly referred to as "Spaghetti Junction".

During Simon Mayo's first year as host, the champion also had the right to start the Thunderball draw. In the second series however, the runner up in Round 2 started the Thunderball draw and the Wonderwall winner started the main Lotto draw.

Transmissions

International versions

An Italian version were also broadcast on Rai Uno, like part of Domenica in on 2000–2001 with the game "The Wonderwall".

References

External links

1999 British television series debuts
2004 British television series endings
1990s British game shows
2000s British game shows
BBC television game shows
British game shows about lotteries